Bhayaanak Panja (Dangerous Claw) is a Hindi horror film of Bollywood directed and produced by Rajesh Mittal. The film was released on 16 August 1997 under the banner of Nirmala Movietone.

Plot
Thakur Vikram Sing, local landlord resides in his haveli (bungalow) in remote village Raigarh. One day he is murdered mysteriously in his haveli. A newspaper editor sends a group of reporters to the haunted bungalow to cover the murder story and investigation. While staying at this place they face an evil murderous ghost.

Cast
 Gajendra Chauhan
 Anil Dhawan
 Menaka (actress)
 Tina Ghai
 Sreepradha
 Bharat Kapoor
 Kumar Rajesh
 Birbal
 Nirmala

External links

References

1997 films
Indian horror films
1990s Hindi-language films
1997 horror films
Hindi-language horror films